Liga Deportiva Universitaria de Quito's 1998 season was the club's 68th year of existence, the 45th year in professional football, and the 38th in the top level of professional football in Ecuador.

Kits
Supplier: Umbro
Sponsor(s): La Lechera, Crunch

Squad

Competitions

Serie A

First stage

First phase

Note: Penalty shootout extra points: Aucas & Olmedo (5); D. Quito, Emelec, LDU Quito & T. Universitario (4); Barcelona & Panamá (3); Delfín, El Nacional & ESPOLI (2); D. Cuenca (1)

Results

Second phase

Grupo Libertadores

Note: Penalty shootout extra points: LDU Quito (1)

Results

Second stage

First phase

Group 2

Note: Penalty shootout extra points: LDU Quito (3); Olmedo & T. Universitario (2); Barcelona, Delfín & D. Cuenca (1)

Results

Second phase

Grupo Libertadores

Note: Penalty shootout extra points: Barcelona (2); D. Quito (1)

Results

Finals

Results

Copa CONMEBOL

First round

Results

Quarter-finals

Results

References
RSSSF - 1998 Serie A 
RSSSF - 1998 Copa Conmebol

External links
Official Site 
Técnico Universitario (0) - LDU Quito (3) 3rd goal
LDU Quito (6) - Emelec (1)
Delfín (2) - LDU Quito (2) 2nd goal
D. Quito (0) - LDU Quito (1)
LDU Quito (7) - Emelec (0)
LDU Quito (7) - Emelec (0)

1998